Slavkovce, in , is a village in eastern Kosovo. The village is situated in the southern part of the Kopaonik mountain range. The river Slakovce which originates higher up in the mountains in the northern direction and which enters the Sitnica river near Pestova flows through Sllakovc. Nearby villages include Samodreha and Ciceli.

Notes

References 

Villages in Vushtrri
Kopaonik